Simple Encrypted Arithmetic Library or SEAL is a free and open-source cross platform software library developed by Microsoft Research that implements various forms of homomorphic encryption.

History 
Development originally came out of the Cryptonets paper, demonstrating that artificial intelligence algorithms could be run on homomorphically encrypted data.

It is open-source (under the MIT License) and written in standard C++ without external dependencies and so it can be compiled cross platform. An official .NET wrapper written in C# is available and makes it easier for .NET applications to interact with SEAL.

Features

Algorithms 
Microsoft SEAL supports both asymmetric and symmetric (added in version 3.4) encryption algorithms.

Scheme types 
Microsoft SEAL comes with two different homomorphic encryption schemes with very different properties:

 BFV: The BFV scheme allows modular arithmetic to be performed on encrypted integers. For applications where exact values are necessary, the BFV scheme is the only choice.
 CKKS: The CKKS scheme allows additions and multiplications on encrypted real or complex numbers, but yields only approximate results. In applications such as summing up encrypted real numbers, evaluating machine learning models on encrypted data, or computing distances of encrypted locations CKKS is going to be by far the best choice.

Compression 
Data compression can be achieved by building SEAL with Zlib support. By default, data is compressed using the DEFLATE algorithm which achieves significant memory footprint savings when serializing objects such as encryption parameters, ciphertexts, plaintexts, and all available keys: Public, Secret, Relin (relinearization), and Galois. Compression can always be disabled.

Availability 
There are several known ports of SEAL to other languages in active development:

C++ 
 Microsoft SEAL (Microsoft's source)

C#/F# 
 NuGet (Microsoft's official package)

Python 
 PySEAL
 SEAL-Python
 tf-seal
 Pyfhel

JavaScript 
 node-seal
 sealjs

TypeScript 
node-seal

References

External links 

Homomorphic encryption
Cryptographic software
Free and open-source software
Microsoft free software
Microsoft Research
Free software programmed in C++
Software using the MIT license
2018 software